is a 2014 Japanese television series based on the manga. The live-action series was announced on January 11, 2014. It aired on Fuji Television from April 9 to June 18, 2014. It starred Shingo Katori, Mariya Nishiuchi, Honami Suzuki and Shōsuke Tanihara.

Cast 
 Shingo Katori as Nagareta Enishi
 Mariya Nishiuchi as Ishinomaki Sakurako
 Honami Suzuki as Chiyoda Maki
 Shosuke Tanihara as Kashiwagi Natsuki
 Yuma Nakayama as Matsui Jotaro
 Tamae Ando as Komiyama Shoko
 Kokone Hamada as Chiyoda Kurumi
 Kana Kurashina as Nagatomo Emily
 Issey Ogata as Tasaka Shigeru

Episodes

References

External links 
  

Japanese drama television series
2014 Japanese television series debuts
2014 Japanese television series endings
Fuji TV dramas